James Aguiar (December 10, 1946 – August 13, 2015) was an American football and wrestling coach. He served as the head football coach at Plymouth State University in 1980, compiling a record of 6–3–1.

Head coaching record

Football

References

1946 births
2015 deaths
American wrestling coaches
Boston University Terriers football players
Plymouth State Panthers football coaches
College wrestling coaches in the United States
Sportspeople from Biddeford, Maine
Players of American football from Maine